Wim de Vos (born 18 March 1968) is a Dutch former professional cyclo-cross cyclist. He notably won the Dutch National Cyclo-cross Championships in 1997 and a bronze medal at the 1993 UCI World Championships.

Major results

Cyclo-cross

1984–1985
 3rd  UCI Junior World Championships
1985–1986
 3rd  UCI Junior World Championships
1992–1993
 3rd  UCI World Championships
 Superprestige
3rd Diegem
1993–1994
 Superprestige
2nd Plzeň
 3rd Jaarmarktcross Niel
1994–1995
 Superprestige
2nd Overijse
3rd Milan
1995–1996
 Superprestige
1st Gavere
1st Plzeň
1996–1997
 1st  National Championships
 Superprestige
2nd Diegem
3rd Sint-Michielsgestel
 UCI World Cup
3rd Prata di Pordenone
 5th UCI World Championships
1997–1998
 2nd GP Rouwmoer
1998–1999
 2nd National Championships
 Superprestige
3rd Sint-Michielsgestel
1999–2000
 3rd National Championships
 3rd Petange
 3rd Hittnau
2000–2001
 2nd National Championships
 3rd Dagmersellen
2001–2002
 3rd National Championships

MTB
1990
 1st  National XCO Championships

References

External links

1968 births
Living people
Dutch male cyclists
Sportspeople from Tilburg
Cyclo-cross cyclists
Cyclists from North Brabant